The 2020 Sudamérica Rugby Sevens was the 14th edition of the Sudamérica Rugby Sevens. It was held in Valparaíso, Chile from 12–13 December. Brazil upset Argentina on Day One of the competition. Argentina in the end won the Sudamérica Sevens title after defeating Brazil in the final.

Teams

Tournament

Day 1

Day 2

References 

2020 rugby sevens competitions
2020 in South American rugby union
Rugby sevens competitions in South America
International rugby union competitions hosted by Chile
2020 in Chilean sport
December 2020 sports events in South America